is a turn-based strategy video game produced by Konami in September 1997 in Japan only (with the re-release as a Konami the Best title in December 1999). It features characters and conflicts based upon the popular Parodius series of video games which in turn is a parody of the long running Gradius series. It is the last installment of the Parodius series and is the Parodius equivalent to Cosmic Wars, a turn-based strategy game set in the Gradius universe, or R-Type Tactics, set in the R-Type universe.

Plot
The "second great world war Parodius" that led the world into a fit of laughter ended more than 50 years ago. Three military organizations: "The Alliance Penta", "Organization Koitsu and Aitsu" and "Alliance Araji" will control each other in secret, and as a result of peace is maintained through this exquisite balance. However, this stability began to alter when a mysterious cat named John Myan Jiro begins to interfere in these relationships. Win the "third great war of the world Parodius" for peace and honor of your country!

Characters and voices 
 Hikaru - Voiced by Yuko Nagashima
 Akane - Voiced by Mariko Onodera
 John Nyan Jiro - Voiced by Isamu Tanonaka
  ( Pentarou) - Voiced by Fuyumi Shiraishi
  (a.k.a. Michael) - Voiced by Rica Matsumoto
  (a.k.a. Yoshiko) - Voiced by Shigeru Chiba

Gameplay
The object of Paro Wars is to utilize an army composed of Parodius characters (penguins, octopuses, etc.) and battle enemies on various 3D-rendered battlefields. There are many different unit types, ranging from troops, to planes, to tank-like vehicles. A single scenario may take multiple hours to complete.

Board Game
 A Board Game based on the video game Paro Wars was Developed by Konami on February 11, 1998, in Japan.

Notes

References
 Information about Paro Wars at Gamestone.co.uk

1997 video games
Japan-exclusive video games
Parodius
PlayStation (console)-only games
Turn-based strategy video games
PlayStation (console) games
Board games
Video games developed in Japan